Johane Masowe is a name attributed to fellowship and the white garment African church. Its founding can be traced back in 1932, in the Norton, Marimba park , Mashonaland West province, in Zimbabwe. It was founded by Shoniwa Masedza (born 1914– died 1973), an African preacher and religious leader.  The name "Johane Masowe" means "John of the Wilderness", and alludes to John the Baptist.

In 1932, Masowe suffered a long illness, and was unable to speak or walk. Afterwards, he believed he had been "sent from Heaven to carry out religious work among the natives". He initially had the nickname "Sixpence".

He proclaimed that the holy spirit Johane (John the baptist) was upon him to proclaim the Gospel to the black africans so that when they die, their spirits will be able to go to God Almight in heaven. This was opposed to the African beliefs expecially in Zimbabwe where the majority worshipped ancestors and followed the spirit mediums.  

He spent the 1930s as an itinerant preacher throughout southern Africa, and settled in Port Elizabeth in 1947.

Masowe's followers eventually created several different churches.  These include the Masowe weChishanu Church (weChishanu referring to observing the Sabbath on Friday), and the Gospel of God Church, which observes Sabbath on Saturdays.

The term Vapostori is used to describe those who follow the teachings of Masowe as well as some closely linked traditions.

Notes
 vapostori is also used to refer white garment churches in zimbabwe, most of them. they worship their God in shrines not on built temples

References

 
 
 
 
 

1914 births
1973 deaths
Religious leaders in Africa